Stonier is a surname. Notable people with the surname include:

G. W. Stonier (1903–1985), English critic, novelist and radio playwright and a literary editor of the New Statesman
Monica Stonier,  American politician of the Democratic Party
Nigel Stonier, UK-based rock, roots and pop producer, songwriter and multi-instrumentalist